The Paris Concert is a posthumously-released live album by jazz musician John Coltrane. Despite the album title, some sources assert it was recorded at a concert in Berlin on 2 November 1963. Other music from this concert was issued on Afro Blue Impressions. Others claim it was indeed recorded in Paris, on 17 November 1962.

Reception

In a review for AllMusic, Scott Yanow called the album "excellent" and wrote: "Although the sound and passion of the group on this date will not surprise veteran listeners, it is always interesting to hear new variations of songs already definitively recorded in the studios. The Paris Concert is recommended to all true Coltrane fanatics."

Track listing

Personnel
 John Coltrane — tenor saxophone/soprano saxophone
 McCoy Tyner — piano
 Jimmy Garrison — double bass  
 Elvin Jones — drums

References

John Coltrane live albums
1963 live albums
Pablo Records live albums
Live albums published posthumously